E. V. Velu (born 15 March 1951) is an Indian Tamil and Minister of Public works, Highways and Minor Ports for Tamilnadu. He served as former Minister for Food in the state of Tamil Nadu, India. He was praised as " Ethilum vallavar Velu" by former chief minister Kalaignar Karunanithi .

Velu has been elected to the Tamil Nadu legislative assembly as All India Anna Dravida Munnetra Kazhagam (AIADMK) party candidate from Thandarambattu constituency, in 1984. In 1997, he joined DMK and got elected from the same constituency in 2001 and 2006. He was subsequently elected twice from Tiruvannamalai constituency as a Dravida Munnetra Kazhagam candidate in 2011 and 2016.

Velu was born in Se. Gudalore on 15 March 1951.

Elections Contested and results

References 

Dravida Munnetra Kazhagam politicians
State cabinet ministers of Tamil Nadu
Living people
1951 births
Tamil Nadu MLAs 2001–2006
Tamil Nadu MLAs 2006–2011
Tamil Nadu MLAs 2011–2016
Tamil Nadu MLAs 2016–2021
All India Anna Dravida Munnetra Kazhagam politicians
Tamil Nadu MLAs 2021–2026
Tamil Nadu politicians